Toxostoma is a genus of bird in the family Mimidae. This genus contains most of the birds called thrashers, and accordingly members of this genus are sometimes referred to as the "typical thrashers".

Description
They measure 22 to 32 cm long. Its tail is straight and quite long, as much or more than the body. As in the mulattoes and the mockingbirds, the bill is curved downwards, and is generally long, although it varies according to the species. Its plumage is opaque, brownish or greyish, with darker wings and tail. On the wings there are usually stripes of a lighter shade. The feathers on the throat, chest and belly are usually light (white or greyish) and in most species these parts of the body have dark spots. The eyes can be yellow, orange or reddish.

They generally feed on insects, but also on fruits, seeds, worms, molluscs and, occasionally, small reptiles.

Most are songbirds that make musical sounds, and are therefore prized as cage birds. Some species also have migratory habits, since in summer they move to the south of their nesting area. They prefer desert or semi-desert habitats and areas of shrubby vegetation; some species inhabit forests, and only one (T. guttatum) is tropical.

Species
The genus name Toxostoma comes from the Ancient Greek , "bow" or "arch" and stoma, "mouth".

The genus contains the following species:

References

 
Mimidae
Bird genera

Taxonomy articles created by Polbot